The Night We Got the Bird is a 1961 British comedy film and a follow up to the 1959 film The Night We Dropped a Clanger. Directed by Darcy Conyers and starring Brian Rix, Dora Bryan, Ronald Shiner and Irene Handl. it is based on Basil Thomas's play "The Love Birds", and was the last film appearance by Ronald Shiner.

The title references a phrase in British English with its origin in the world of 19th century theatre, where it was customary to hiss like a goose to express disapproval.

Plot
When unscrupulous Brighton antiques dealer Cecil Gibson (Ronald Shiner) dies in a road accident, his widow Julie (Dora Bryan) remarries, and her new husband Bertie (Brian Rix) was Cecil's innocent but naive business partner. One of their wedding presents, from an unknown source, is a mouthy South American parrot, which appears to be a reincarnated Cecil whose aim is to make married life difficult for Bertie. As Bertie and Julie go off on their honeymoon, they are chased by a gangster because of a fake antique bed that the late Cecil substituted for the real thing which he then sold for a profit.

Cast
 Brian Rix - Bertie Skidmore
 Dora Bryan - Julie Skidmore
 Ronald Shiner - Cecil Gibson
 Leo Franklyn - Victor
 Liz Fraser - Fay
 Irene Handl - Ma
 Terry Scott - P. C. Lovejoy
 Reginald Beckwith - Chippendale Charlie
 John Le Mesurier - Court Clerk

Production
The film was made at Shepperton Studios, Surrey, England, and on location. A collection of then-and-now location stills and corresponding contemporary photographs is hosted at reelstreets.com.

Critical reception
TV Guide wrote, "sophomoric British comedy...The script finds lots of excuses for people to lose their pants and make vulgar, inane sexual jokes that wouldn't amuse a 10-year-old." Allmovie wrote, "several hilarious slapstick scenes involving chases or sexual encounters, as well as the more reserved wit found in caricatures like an inept magistrate, are all hallmarks of a typically British sense of humor here (shared by many non-Brits)." Sky movies wrote, "a fast and furious farce...With humour that's a notch below the contemporary 'Carry On' films. Never mind, there are some priceless cameo performances from the supporting cast, including Robertson Hare as a dithering doctor, John le Mesurier as a long-suffering court clerk, Kynaston Reeves, hilarious as a deaf magistrate, and Terry Scott as a constable."

External links

References

1961 films
1961 comedy films
Films set in Brighton
British comedy films
1960s English-language films
1960s British films